Chisocheton pohlianus belonging to the Mahogany Family (Meliaceae), is a small, lower story, leptocaul rainforest tree from New Guinea no more than  in height and  thick. Each time the tiny circinate bud at the tip of the leaf forms a new pair of leaflets, the leaf simultaneously produces, further back, a small  inflorescence, but not at the same spot as where a pair of leaflets are attached, but halfway between two pairs of leaflets. The jury is still out as to whether these are inflorescences fused to a leaf (as in Tilia spp and Phyllobotryon spp) or whether the leaves have assumed reproductive function (as in certain Streptocarpus spp). The difficulty is in reconciling an indeterminate leaf with determinate inflorescences. The flowers are tubular, about one-half inch (one cm) in length with 3 to ten petals, crème de menthe in color and said to have the fragrance of Cymbopogon.

References

pohlianus
Trees
Flora of New Guinea